Richard Nadeau (born April 5, 1959 in Hawkesbury, Ontario) is a teacher and Bloc Québécois politician in Quebec, Canada. He is the former Member of Parliament for the riding of Gatineau. Nadeau attended the University of Ottawa where he received degrees in history, political science and education. In addition to being a teacher, Nadeau has worked as an adviser and director of educational programs, and as a researcher and an archivist. He has also been a lobbyist for French education and has been involved in community theatre in Saskatchewan.

He taught at the Gisèle Lalonde High School in Orleans, near Ottawa, where he, amongst other things, supervised and acted as speaker for the student debate club.

In the 2000 federal election, Nadeau finished second in Gatineau behind Mark Assad of the Liberal Party of Canada by 13,197 votes. In the 2004 federal election, he finished second behind  Françoise Boivin of the Liberals by 830 votes—a surprisingly close result, given that this had long been reckoned as one of the more federalist regions of Quebec.

He was elected  in the 2006 federal election in a rematch against Boivin, becoming the first Bloc MP elected in the National Capital Region.  He was also the third Bloc MP ever elected in the entire Outaouais region, after Maurice Dumas and Mario Laframboise.

Nadeau's wife, Edith Gendron, is the head of a Quebec separatist group called "Le Quebec, Un Pays". She was also the Parti Québécois candidate for the riding of Chapleau in Gatineau, in the 2007 provincial election.

In the 2008 Canadian federal election Nadeau received the smallest percentage of votes for a winning candidate, at just 29.13%, meaning that less than 3 out of 10 voters chose him as their candidate, despite him winning a plurality of votes and carrying the district for the Bloc over Boivin, now running for the New Democratic Party.

Nadeau was heavily defeated by Boivin in the 2011 election by over 27,000 votes as part of the massive NDP surge across Quebec.  He tallied barely half of his vote from 2008.

Works

External links
 

1959 births
Living people
Bloc Québécois MPs
Franco-Ontarian people
French Quebecers
Members of the House of Commons of Canada from Quebec
Politicians from Gatineau
University of Ottawa alumni
People from Hawkesbury, Ontario
21st-century Canadian politicians